Clinton Purnell (born 5 May 1989) is a Welsh gymnast.

Purnell is a multiple Welsh champion and competed at the 2010 Commonwealth Games and most recently the 2014 Commonwealth Games in Glasgow.

References

British male artistic gymnasts
1989 births
Welsh male artistic gymnasts
Gymnasts at the 2010 Commonwealth Games
Gymnasts at the 2014 Commonwealth Games
Commonwealth Games competitors for Wales
Living people
Gymnasts at the 2018 Commonwealth Games